Ulukışla is a town and district of Niğde Province in the Central Anatolia region of Turkey. It covers an area of 1,502 km², and the altitude is 1,427 m. Population is 22,728 of which 5,594 live in the town of Ulukışla.

The town of Ulukışla lies in a valley between the Medetsiz and Bolkar ranges of the Taurus Mountains, throughout history an important crossing from the Mediterranean to the plains of Konya and other parts of central Anatolia. This is a mountainous district and minerals including gold, silver, lead, coal and limestone have been mined here over the centuries. The climate is dry and the vegetation typical of the dry steppes of central Anatolia, summers are hot and dry, winters are cold and it snows. Wheat is grown in the valley.

History
There are burial mounds höyük and other signs of occupation going back to the Hittites and even earlier. The area was later occupied by Phrygians, and Romans. the tomb of Faustina the Younger, wife of Emperor Marcus Aurelius was found in the village of  Toraman, and the baths of Çiftehan claim among their patrons Cleopatra (in the time when she was living in Tarsus). The Byzantines had armies based here, and then Ulukışla remained an important town in the time of the Ottoman Empire.

According to the Ottoman General Census of 1881/82-1893, the kaza of Ulukışla had a total population of 9.182, consisting of 7.851 Muslims and 1.331 Greeks.

Ulukışla today
Ulukışla is a small market town in a rural area. The railway and the E5 highway from Adana and the south-east of Turkey to Ankara and the west pass through here. There is a technical college of Niğde University here.

Places of interest
The mineral baths of Çiftehan.
The 17th century caravanserai of Öküz Mehmet Paşa.
Medetsiz mountain and other peaks in the Bolkar range which include caves and canyons.

References

External links

 District governor's official website 
 District municipality's official website 
 A web portal of Niğde 
 Yesilbor.com 

Cappadocia
Towns in Turkey
Populated places in Niğde Province
Districts of Niğde Province